Paillé is a commune in France

Paille or Paillé may also refer to:

 Daniel Paille (born 1984), ice hockey player
 Daniel Paillé (born 1950), politician
 Marcel Paille (1932–2002), ice hockey player
 Pascal-Pierre Paillé (born 1978), politician
 Stéphane Paille (born 1965), footballer
 Suzanne Amomba Paillé (ca. 1673-1683-1755), French Guinean planter and philanthropist

See also
 Pommes paille, French name for a type of French fries
 Paille-maille, lawn game
 Vin de paille, French term for straw wine